Kanggeonneo maeul (강 건너 마을) (The Town Across the River) is a 1935 Korean film directed by Na Woon-gyu. It premiered at the Dansungsa theater in downtown Seoul.

Plot
This film is a melodrama concerning a spoiled only son, played by Jeon Taek-yi. After his father scolds him for his excessive drinking, he sells the family's only cow for money to leave for Seoul. Finding life difficult on his own in Seoul, he returns to his family begging forgiveness.

Artistic significance
The film aimed for socialist realism.

See also
 Korea under Japanese rule
 List of Korean-language films
 Cinema of Korea

References

External links 
 Images from Kanggeonneo maeul at The Korean Film Archive (KOFA)
 

1935 films
Pre-1948 Korean films
Korean black-and-white films
Films directed by Na Woon-gyu
Melodrama films
1935 drama films